was a Japanese central banker, and 22nd Governor of the Bank of Japan (BOJ).

Early life
Sasaki was born in Yamaguchi Prefecture.

Banking career
Sasaki was BOJ Governor from December 17, 1969, to December 16, 1974.

Immediately prior, he had been Deputy Governor.

Tenure as BOJ Governor
During Sasaki's tenure, BOJ became a shareholder of the Bank for International Settlements BIS); however, in 1970, the head of the Japanese central bank was not invited to become a member of the BIS Board of Directors.

In 1972 Japan experienced an unexpectedly high rate of economic growth. However, the country began to increase its focus on social welfare and quality of life, which marked a significant change from Japan's policy of "economic growth first" in the years since the end of World War II.

Inflationary pressures occurred as a result of these measures, which Sasaki countered by forecasting tighter monetary policy in early 1973.

Notes

References
 Toniolo, Gianni. (2005). Central Bank Cooperation at the Bank for International Settlements, 1930–1973. Cambridge: Cambridge University Press. 
 Werner, Richard A. (2003). Princes of the Yen: Japan's Central Bankers and the Transformation of the Economy. Armonk, New York: M.E. Sharpe. 

1907 births
1988 deaths
20th-century Japanese economists
Governors of the Bank of Japan
People from Yamaguchi Prefecture